Old House is an unincorporated community in Jasper County, South Carolina, United States.

The community is named after the Old House Plantation, which was settled 1740 by Daniel Heyward. The plantation included a tidal mill, textile factory and an import-export business, all of which were destroyed by fire in 1865. The site includes the grave of Thomas Heyward, Jr., a signer of the Declaration of Independence and of the Articles of Confederation as a representative of South Carolina.

See also
 Broad River
 Honey Hill-Boyd's Neck Battlefield
 White Hall Plantation House Ruins

References

Unincorporated communities in Jasper County, South Carolina
Unincorporated communities in South Carolina